Magnus ( – 23 August 1106) was the duke of Saxony from 1072 to 1106. Eldest son and successor of Ordulf and Wulfhild of Norway, he was the last member of the House of Billung.

Rebellion
In 1070, before he was duke, he joined Otto of Nordheim, duke of Bavaria, in rebellion against the Salian Emperor Henry IV.  Otto was accused of being privy to a plot to murder the king, and it was decided he should submit to the ordeal of battle with his accuser. The duke asked for safe-conduct to and from the place of meeting.  When this was refused he declined to appear, and was consequently deprived of Bavaria, while his Saxon estates were plundered. The rebellion was put down in 1071, and Magnus was captured.  Magnus was imprisoned in the castle of Harzburg, the imposing imperial fortress which so inflamed the Saxon freemen. He was not released upon his accession to the Saxon duchy until seventy Swabians captured in Lüneburg were released.

First battle of Langensalza
In 1073, Harzburg was destroyed and the anger of Henry aroused.  He renewed the conflict with Saxony once more.  At the first battle of Langensalza in 1075, Magnus was captured again.  After being released again, he joined Rudolf von Rheinfeld, duke of Swabia and anti-king, and was present at the Battle of Mellrichstadt (7 August 1078), where he saved Rudolf's life. However, he and the Saxons never fully supported the Swabian Rudolf and he reconciled with Henry, even fighting the Slavs with the royal forces.

Legacy
Magnus was an embittered enemy of the archbishop of Bremen, Adalbert, whose see he afflicted with repeated plundering raids. In 1106, the same year as Henry IV, he died.  His duchy was given to Lothair of Supplinburg and his lands were split between his daughters by Sophia (married 1071), the daughter of Béla I of Hungary, going thus to the house of Welf, via Wulfhilde (1075–1126), who married Duke Henry IX of Bavaria and to the house of Ascania via Eilika (1080 – 16 January 1142), who married Count Otto of Ballenstedt.

1040s births
1106 deaths
Dukes of Saxony
House of Billung